The Kerian District (alternately Krian) is an administrative district in Perak, Malaysia.

Due to its closer proximity to Penang, much of Kerian is also part of Greater Penang, Malaysia's second largest conurbation.

The district is one of the main rice-growing areas in Perak.

Administrative divisions

Kerian District is divided into eight mukims, which are:
 Bagan Serai
 Bagan Tiang
 Beriah
 Gunong Semanggol
 Kuala Kurau
 Parit Buntar
 Selinsing
 Tanjung Piandang

Demographics 

The following is based on Department of Statistics Malaysia 2010 census.

Federal Parliament and State Assembly Seats 

List of Kerian district representatives in the Federal Parliament (Dewan Rakyat)

List of Kerian district representatives in the State Legislative Assembly of Perak

See also

 Districts of Malaysia

References

External links
Rancangan Tempatan Daerah Kerian 2020